Naas is a Gaelic Athletic Association (GAA) club in Naas, County Kildare, Ireland, winner of ten Kildare county senior football championships, ten senior hurling championships, four senior camogie championships and Kildare club of the year in 1981.

History
Naas played the Curragh on 15 February 1885 to become one of eight clubs which share the distinction of being the first to play in a Gaelic football match. The GAA  Naas Sunbursts and Naas Crom-A-Boo were listed as unaffiliated clubs in 1896 while nearby Thomastown was an affiliated club. Naas moved to Spooner's Field opposite the racecourse grandstand in 1913. Father Brennan park was opened in 1930. Naas GAA grounds are now situated on the Sallins Rd, the amenities include three new floodlight pitches, a cloths bank, one way traffic management system and a brand new clubhouse.

Hurling
Naas has won the Kildare senior hurling championship nine times. The first of these titles came in 1951 the team was captained by Big Noise Sheridan and Naas successfully defended the title the following year. The club then entered a barren spell and it was not until some 42 years later in 1994 that the  Naas men, captained by Richie Coyle, reclaimed the crown by defeating Coill Dubh. This was the beginning of a golden spell for the club, with further titles following in 1997, 2000 and 2001. The Kildare team that won the Christy Ring Cup in 2018 was captained by Naas’ Brian Byrne. After a seventeen year gap, Naas reclaimed the senior hurling championship in 2019, successfully defended their title in 2020 and completed their first three in a row in 2021.

Notable players
Eamonn Callaghan, senior Kildare player and All Star Nominee 2010.
Eoin Doyle, senior Kildare player and Kildare captain for 2016.
 Barry Reynolds, senior goalkeeper. 
 Dermot Hanifan Jnr, Centre Forward, does not know closer call. Senior Club player of the year 2022, well known for the Dermination of the Sheilmaliers Gaa in Leinster semi-final 2021 and half the women in Naas that night.

Notable managers
Tom Mullally managed the club's hurling team.

Honours
Football
 Kildare Senior Football Championship: (10) 1920, 1922, 1923, 1924, 1928, 1931, 1932, 1990, 2021, 2022
 Kildare Intermediate Football Championship: (2) 1984, 2004
 Kildare Junior Football Championship: (4) 1913, 1919, 1952, 1981
 Kildare Under 21 Football Championship: (3) 1984, 2016, 2019
 Kildare Minor Football Championship: (7) 1934, 1953, 1981, 1983, 2016, 2018, 2019
 All Ireland U-14 Féile Div 1: 2014
 All Ireland U-14 Féile Div 2: 2006

Hurling
 All-Ireland Intermediate Club Hurling Championship: (1) 2021
 Leinster Intermediate Hurling Championship: (1) 2021
 Kildare Senior Hurling Championship: (10) 1951, 1952, 1994, 1997, 2001, 2002, 2019, 2020, 2021, 2022
 Kildare Junior Hurling Championship (7) 1942, 1946, 1947, 1948, 1964, 1972, 1993, 2019
 Kildare Under 21 Hurling Championship 1994, 2009, 2011, 2012, 2013, 2016, 2017, 2018, 2019
 Kildare Minor Hurling Championship: 1955, 1977, 1981, 1983, 1986, 1987, 1991, 2007, 2009, 2010, 2013, 2014, 2015, 2016, 2018, 2019, 2021, 2022
 All Ireland U-14 Féile Div 2: 2014, 2018
 All Ireland U-14 Féile Div 3: 2006

Camogie
 Kildare Senior Camogie Championship (5) 1942, 1959, 1960, 2018, 2022
 Kildare Senior Camogie League 1942, 1955, 1957

References

Bibliography
 To Spooner's Lane And Beyond, Naas GAA 1887-1987 Céad Bliain Ag Fás by Liam McManus, Naas GAA 1987, 214pp.
 Kildare GAA: A Centenary History, by Eoghan Corry, CLG Chill Dara, 1984,  hb  pb
 Kildare GAA yearbook, 1972, 1974, 1978, 1979, 1980 and 2000- in sequence especially the Millennium yearbook of 2000
 Soaring Sliothars: Centenary of Kildare Camogie 1904-2004 by Joan O'Flynn Kildare County Camogie Board. The Eoin Hughes remorial cup 1947-1994 The michael O'leary cup 1953-1999

External links
 Naas GAA site
Naas GAA on Facebook

Kildare GAA site
Kildare GAA club sites
Kildare on Hoganstand.com

Naas
Gaelic games clubs in County Kildare
Gaelic football clubs in County Kildare
Hurling clubs in County Kildare